Christophe Moulin (born 23 April 1971) is a football coach and former player from Switzerland who works as "Performance Coach" for the Irish Football Association and who is the currently first-team coach for Ligue 1 club Nice.

Moulin played for four Swiss professional clubs before taking up the role of Academy Manager of Neuchâtel Xamax FC for five years.

During the 2003–04 season he was appointed as caretaker head coach of Swiss Super League club Neuchâtel Xamax FC and managed to save them from relegation.

External links
 
 
 

1971 births
Living people
Swiss men's footballers
Association football defenders
Étoile Carouge FC players
SR Delémont players
FC Solothurn players
Neuchâtel Xamax FCS players
Swiss Super League players
Neuchâtel Xamax FCS managers